Joseph Raymond Frenette (April 16, 1935 – July 13, 2018) was a Canadian politician in New Brunswick.  He was a Liberal representative for the riding of Moncton East in the Legislative Assembly of New Brunswick from 1974 until 1998 when he retired after a short term as the 28th premier of New Brunswick.

The son of Berthilde Pitre and Samuel Frenette, before his election to the legislature, he was a Councillor for the village of Lewisville and, after Lewisville was amalgamated with the city of Moncton, he was a Moncton city Councillor.

He twice ran for leader of the New Brunswick Liberals. He lost in 1982 to Doug Young, and in 1985 to Frank McKenna. He served as interim leader of the party from 1983 to 1985 and again from October 1997 to May 1998, also serving as Premier.

Frenette was Frank McKenna's right-hand man in the legislature, serving as his House Leader throughout his tenure as leader from 1985 to 1997. He resigned from the New Brunswick legislature in July 1998.

Following his political career, Frenette was appointed by Prime Minister Jean Chrétien to be a director of Atomic Energy of Canada Limited (AECL) for a three-year term from 1998–2001 following which he served as chair from 2001–05.

On May 11, 2006 it was announced that he would be New Brunswick chair of Gerard Kennedy's campaign for the leadership of the Liberal Party of Canada.

References

1935 births
2018 deaths
Acadian people
Deputy premiers of New Brunswick
Moncton city councillors
New Brunswick Liberal Association MLAs
People from Gloucester County, New Brunswick
Premiers of New Brunswick